Matteo Berrettini was the defending champion but chose not to defend his title.

Daniel Elahi Galán won the title after defeating Sergio Gutiérrez Ferrol 6–2, 3–6, 6–2 in the final.

Seeds

Draw

Finals

Top half

Bottom half

References
Main Draw
Qualifying Draw

San Benedetto Tennis Cup - Singles
2018 Singles